Imperator is a genus of fungi in the family Boletaceae.  It was  circumscribed in 2015 by Boris Assyov and colleagues. The erection of Imperator follows recent molecular studies that outlined a new phylogenetic framework for the Boletaceae.

The type species is Imperator torosus, an "impressive and prestigious" species to which the generic name Imperator refers.

Species
The following species have been reclassified in the new genus.

References

External links

Boletaceae
Boletales genera